"Sunny Days" is the second single by British ska/indie band Kid British.
The song was free on iTunes for a short period of time when first released.

The single was released on 20 April 2009 on CD and digital download.

Track listing
"Sunny Days"
"Part Time Job/Shirt & Tie"

References

2009 singles
2009 songs
Kid British songs
Mercury Records singles